David Trevor Shutt, Baron Shutt of Greetland,  (16 March 1942 – 30 October 2020) was a British Liberal Democrat politician who served as Captain of the Yeomen of the Guard and Deputy Chief Whip in the House of Lords between May 2010 and May 2012.

Early life
Shutt was born at Farsley, Leeds and attended Pudsey Grammar School in Yorkshire.

Career
After school Shutt trained as an accountant. In 1975 he became a director of the Joseph Rowntree Reform Trust, of which he later became Chairman. He also became a Trustee of the Joseph Rowntree Charitable Trust. In 1973 he was elected to Calderdale Metropolitan Borough Council, now Calderdale Council, as a Liberal councillor, and later represented the Liberal Democrats on this council, serving as Mayor of Calderdale in 1982–83.

He stood unsuccessfully for Parliament at seven general elections between 1970 and 1992.  He contested Sowerby in 1970, February 1974, October 1974, and 1979. After the abolition of the Sowerby seat, he contested the new Calder Valley constituency in 1983 and 1987. At the 1992 general election he was the Liberal Democrat candidate in Pudsey.

He was appointed an Officer of the Order of the British Empire (OBE) in the 1993 New Year Honours, and on 12 May 2000 was created a life peer as Baron Shutt of Greetland, of Greetland and Stainland in the County of West Yorkshire. He was Liberal Democrat International Development spokesperson in the House of Lords until 2002. Following the 2005 general election, he was appointed the Liberal Democrat Chief Whip in the House of Lords. After the formation of the coalition government headed by David Cameron in May 2010, Shutt was appointed Captain of the Yeomen of the Guard and Government Deputy Chief Whip in the House of Lords, positions he held until May 2012, when he stepped down as the Liberal Democrats' Lords Chief Whip.

Personal life
In 1965, he married Margaret Pemberton, with whom he had two sons and a daughter.

Lord Shutt died on 30 October 2020, at the age of 78.

References

1942 births
2020 deaths
Liberal Democrats (UK) councillors
Liberal Democrats (UK) life peers
Liberal Party (UK) Lords-in-Waiting
Members of the Privy Council of the United Kingdom
Officers of the Order of the British Empire
Councillors in Calderdale
Liberal Democrats (UK) parliamentary candidates
Politicians from Leeds
Life peers created by Elizabeth II